Conus lemniscatus, common name the ribbon cone, is a species of sea snail, a marine gastropod mollusk in the family Conidae, the cone snails and their allies.

 Subspecies
 Conus lemniscatus carcellesi Martins, 1945 (synonym: Lamniconus lemniscatus carcellesi (Martins, 1945)): synonym of Conus carcellesi Martins, 1945
 Conus lemniscatus lemniscatus Reeve, 1849 (synonym: Lamniconus lemniscatus lemniscatus (Reeve, 1849)): synonym of Conus lemniscatus Reeve, 1849

Like all species within the genus Conus, these snails are predatory and venomous. They are capable of "stinging" humans, therefore live ones should be handled carefully or not at all.

Description
The size of an adult shell varies between 20 mm and 65 mm. The shell shows slightly contracted sides. The spire is acuminated with strong growth lines. The body whorl is delicately ridged throughout. The color of the shell is whitish, maculated with chestnut, and with every alternate ridge chestnut-spotted.

Distribution
This species occurs in the Caribbean Sea and in the Western Atlantic Ocean off Brazil and Argentina.

References

 Sowerby, G. B., II. 1865. Descriptions of two new species of Conus from the collection of H. Cuming, ESQ., and two from the collection of the late Mr. Denisson. Proceedings of the Zoological Society of London 1865:518–519, pl. 32
 Filmer R.M. (2001). A Catalogue of Nomenclature and Taxonomy in the Living Conidae 1758 – 1998. Backhuys Publishers, Leiden. 388pp
 Tucker J.K. (2009). Recent cone species database. September 4, 2009 Edition
 Tucker J.K. & Tenorio M.J. (2009) Systematic classification of Recent and fossil conoidean gastropods. Hackenheim: Conchbooks. 296 pp.
 Puillandre N., Duda T.F., Meyer C., Olivera B.M. & Bouchet P. (2015). One, four or 100 genera? A new classification of the cone snails. Journal of Molluscan Studies. 81: 1–23

External links
 The Conus Biodiversity website
 
 Cone Shells – Knights of the Sea

lemniscatus
Gastropods described in 1849